The 1881 Amherst football team represented the Amherst College during the 1881 college football season.

Schedule

References

Amherst
Amherst Mammoths football seasons
College football winless seasons
Amherst football